(7 May 1938 – 23 September 1993) was a Japanese butterfly swimmer and Olympic medalist. He participated at the 1960 Summer Olympics in Rome, winning a bronze medal in 4 x 100 metre medley relay.

References

1938 births
1993 deaths
Japanese male butterfly swimmers
Olympic swimmers of Japan
Olympic bronze medalists for Japan
Swimmers at the 1960 Summer Olympics
Olympic bronze medalists in swimming
Asian Games medalists in swimming
Swimmers at the 1958 Asian Games
Asian Games silver medalists for Japan
Medalists at the 1958 Asian Games
Medalists at the 1960 Summer Olympics
20th-century Japanese people